Liselotte Olsson (sometimes listed as Liselotte Ohlson, born May 29, 1968) is a Swedish sprint canoer who competed in the late 1980s. She finished sixth in the K-4 500 m event at the 1988 Summer Olympics in Seoul.

References
Sports-reference.com profile

1968 births
Canoeists at the 1988 Summer Olympics
Living people
Olympic canoeists of Sweden
Swedish female canoeists